House of Glass may refer to:

 House of Glass (radio program), an American radio drama from 1935 - 1954
 Maison de Verre, a building by French architect Pierre Chareau
 A novel in the Buru Quartet tetralogy by Pramoedya Ananta Toer
 A 2014 novel by Sophie Littlefield
 A 2018 novel by Susan Fletcher
 The house music duo Bini & Martini
 A song from the album Hairless Toys by Róisín Murphy
 The House of Glass (film), a 1918 American film directed by Emile Chautard

See also
 Glass house (disambiguation)